casync (content-addressable synchronisation) is a Linux software utility designed to distribute frequently-updated file system images over the Internet.

Utility
According to the creator Lennart Poettering, casync is inspired by rsync and Git, as well as tar. casync is aimed to be used for Internet of things (IoT), container, virtual machine (VM), portable services, and operating system (OS) images, as well as backups and home directory synchronization. casync splits images into variable size segments, uses sha256 checksums, and aims to work with content delivery networks (CDNs). Available for Linux only, packages are available for Ubuntu, Fedora and Arch Linux.

Similar software
Similar software that delivers file system images are:
 Docker with a layered tarballs
 OSTree

See also
 BitTorrent
 Data deduplication 
 Flatpak
 InterPlanetary File System
 SquashFS
 zsync

References

2017 software
Backup software for Linux
Data synchronization
Free backup software
Free file transfer software
Free network-related software
Linux software
Network file transfer protocols
Software that uses Meson
Unix network-related software